William Gaither Crudup (born July 8, 1968) is an American actor. He is a four-time Tony Award nominee, winning once for his performance in Tom Stoppard's play The Coast of Utopia in 2007. He has starred in numerous high-profile films, including Without Limits (1998), Almost Famous (2000), Big Fish (2003), Mission: Impossible III (2006), Watchmen (2009), Public Enemies (2009), The Stanford Prison Experiment (2015), Jackie (2016), and Alien: Covenant (2017), in both lead and supporting roles. He has been nominated for an Independent Spirit Award for Best Male Lead for his performance in Jesus' Son, and received two Screen Actors Guild Award nominations as part of an ensemble cast for Almost Famous and Spotlight, winning for the latter.

Crudup starred in the streaming television series Gypsy (2017) and The Morning Show (2019), the latter of which earned him a Primetime Emmy Award and a Critics' Choice Television Award. In 2023, he began starring in the Apple TV+ science fiction dramedy series Hello Tomorrow!.

Early life
Crudup was born in Manhasset, New York. His parents, Georgann (née Gaither) and Thomas Henry Crudup III divorced during his childhood, and later remarried, before divorcing a second time. Crudup has spoken of his late father, who died in 2005, as an "incessant gambler and hustler salesman" who continuously sought "to hit the jackpot" throughout his life.

On his father's side, he is a descendant of Congressman Josiah Crudup of North Carolina. His maternal grandfather was William Cotter "Billy" Gaither, Jr., a well-known Florida trial lawyer, and his maternal grandmother later remarried to Episcopal bishop James Duncan.

The middle-born of three brothers, Crudup's brothers, Tommy and Brooks, are both producers. He left New York with his family when he was about eight years old, first living in Texas, then in Florida. He graduated from Saint Thomas Aquinas High School in Fort Lauderdale, Florida in 1986.

Crudup attended the University of North Carolina at Chapel Hill, where he received an undergraduate degree, and he continued his passion for acting with the undergraduate acting company, LAB! Theatre. He also acted for UNC-STV's most popular show, General College. He was a member of the Beta Chapter of Delta Kappa Epsilon. He then studied at New York University's Tisch School of the Arts graduate acting program, where he earned a Master of Fine Arts degree in 1994.

Career

Film and television
Crudup began acting in films such as 1996's Sleepers, 1997's Inventing the Abbotts, and 1998's Without Limits, where he played the role of running legend and Olympian Steve Prefontaine. His first role in an animated feature was in 1999's English release of Princess Mononoke, in which he starred as Ashitaka. He then played lead guitarist Russell Hammond from Stillwater, the fictional band at the center of Cameron Crowe's Almost Famous (2000). In 2006's The Good Shepherd, he played British spy Arch Cummings, a stand-in for Kim Philby. The same year, he played a supporting role in Mission: Impossible III. In 2007, he played the leading role of Henry Roth in the film Dedication.

Crudup completed filming Watchmen with director Zack Snyder in Vancouver, British Columbia. He portrayed the superhero Doctor Manhattan. He portrayed former U.S. Secretary of the Treasury Timothy Geithner in a TV film about 2008's financial crisis, Too Big to Fail (2011). Crudup stars in the Apple TV+ series The Morning Show, for which he won a Primetime Emmy Award in 2020.

Stage

A year after graduating from Tisch, Crudup made his debut on Broadway in the Lincoln Center Theater production of Tom Stoppard's Arcadia.

Crudup received a 2002 Tony Award nomination for Best Actor in a Play for his performance as the title character in The Elephant Man on Broadway, as well as a 2005 nomination for his role as Katurian in the Broadway production of The Pillowman, also starring Jeff Goldblum, which closed on September 18, 2005. From October 2006 through May 2007, he was featured in the first two parts of The Coast of Utopia by Tom Stoppard at Lincoln Center, playing literary critic Vissarion Belinsky, for which he received a 2007 Tony Award for Best Featured Actor in a Play.

He starred in The Metal Children, an off-Broadway play written and directed by Adam Rapp in 2010.

In 2011, Crudup received a Tony Award nomination for Featured Actor in a Play for his role in the Broadway revival of Arcadia.

In August 2013, he co-starred with Ian McKellen and Patrick Stewart in the Harold Pinter play No Man's Land as well as in Waiting for Godot at the Berkeley Repertory Theatre. The shows transferred to The Cort Theatre in New York City, where they ran in repertory until March 2014.

In November 2017, he starred in the world premiere of David Cale's one-man play Harry Clarke at Vineyard Theatre. It moved to the Minetta Lane Theatre the following spring.

Other work
From 1998 to 2005, Crudup was the narrator for the U.S. television ad campaign "Priceless" for Mastercard. In the ads, the narrator (Crudup) lists the prices of two goods or services, then lists some third, intangible benefit gained from those purchases and concludes, "priceless". He said in 2005 that appearing in the ads "changed my life", in that they gave him the financial freedom to pursue the acting work that he wanted to do.

He appeared as Zartan in the 2009 parody video The Ballad of G.I. Joe on the website Funny or Die.

Personal life
From 1996 to November 2003, Crudup was in a relationship with actress Mary-Louise Parker. She was seven months pregnant with their son, born in January 2004, when Crudup ended their relationship and began dating actress Claire Danes. Crudup and Danes separated in 2006. Since 2017, Crudup has been dating Australian actress Naomi Watts after they met on the set of the Netflix drama series Gypsy.

Filmography

Film

Television

Short film

Stage

Accolades 
The following is a list of accolades Crudup has received or been nominated for throughout his film, television and theatre career:

References

External links

Living people
20th-century American male actors
21st-century American male actors
American male film actors
American male stage actors
American male television actors
Male actors from New York (state)
Tisch School of the Arts alumni
People from Manhasset, New York
Crudup, Billy
University of North Carolina at Chapel Hill alumni
Outstanding Performance by a Cast in a Motion Picture Screen Actors Guild Award winners
Outstanding Performance by a Supporting Actor in a Drama Series Primetime Emmy Award winners
Tony Award winners
1968 births
American people of French descent